NGC 143 is a  spiral galaxy in the constellation Cetus. It was discovered by Frank Muller in 1886.

References 

Barred spiral galaxies
-04-02-015
0143
001911
Cetus (constellation)